Grazzanise Air Base (also known as "Carlo Romagnoli Airport") (ICAO: LIRM) is an Italian Air Force air base  south of Grazzanise, in the Province of Caserta in the region of Campania, located about  west of Caserta (the airport for this city), and  northwest of Naples, Italy.

It has two, parallel runways (06/24) with the main, asphalt runway being 06R/24L,  x , at elevation . The parallel concrete runway is for limited helicopter operations, as it has no taxiway connection to the rest of the base. There is a dispersal and hangar area on the eastern end for nine aircraft, with larger maintenance hangars and parking areas at each end.

Navigation aids sited at the field are TACAN and NDB.

Units
It is the base for:
  9º Stormo Francesco Baracca (Italian entry) (9th Combat Search and Rescue Wing), part of Support and Special Forces Command
  2nd NATO Signal Squadron (a component of the NATO Communications and Information Agency, supporting the Allied Joint Force Command Naples)

Previous use
The air base was formerly the site of operations for squadrons equipped with the North American F-86 Sabre, Fiat G.91 and Lockheed F-104 Starfighter. An F-86 is mounted on a pole within the compound near the air base.

References

Italian airbases
Airports in Italy
Province of Caserta